was a Japanese samurai of the Azuchi-Momoyama period, who served the Toyotomi clan.

Samurai
1595 deaths
Year of birth unknown